Evan Peter Mast, also known by his stage name E*vax or E.VAX, is an American electronic music artist and one-half of the New York-based electronic rock band Ratatat, alongside Mike Stroud.

Career
Mast met his Ratatat bandmate Mike Stroud when they were both students at Skidmore College. They released their self-titled debut album in 2004, followed by four more studio albums.

Mast has released 7-inch singles on Static Caravan Recordings and Mold Recordings, along with an EP in collaboration with musician Craig Wedren, most known as the lead vocalist and guitarist of the band Shudder to Think. Mast also recorded a track titled "The Mule" for the TV show Silicon Valley.

Mast has written and produced hip hop music as E*vax. His first credit was the track "Look Alive" performed by rapper Despot featuring Mast’s own band Ratatat from the record label Definitive Jux compilation album Definitive Jux Presents IV, released in 2009. Some years later he produced a track titled "$100 Bill" performed by rapper Jay-Z, which is the opening track from Music from Baz Luhrmann's Film The Great Gatsby released in 2013. Once again he collaborated with Despot in 2015, producing the track "House of Bricks", the lead single from the rapper’s debut studio album We’re All Excited. In 2018 Mast worked together with rapper-producer Kanye West on the so called Wyoming Sessions, which led him to write and produce in the Kids See Ghosts's self-titled debut studio album tracks "Feel the Love", "Fire" and "Reborn"; as well as the Nas track "Adam and Eve" from the rapper's twelfth studio album Nasir, and also a track from Teyana Taylor's second studio album K.T.S.E. titled "Rose in Harlem". The next year he co-produced "Selah", the second track from Kanye West's ninth studio album Jesus Is King, while he once again collaborated with Teyana Taylor, producing her single "We Got Love" from her third studio album The Album, released in 2020.

As E.VAX, he released a self-titled album on September 17, 2021. It was announced in June 2021. He released two singles from the album, "Rabindra" and "Karst".

Other ventures
E*vax and his brother E*rock operate their independent record label Audio Dregs. His first album, Parking Lot Music, was released on 4 April 2001. Mast's music uses everyday sounds to create simple electronic beats.

Discography

Studio albums

Extended plays

Production and songwriting credits
 Despot – "Look Alive" (featuring Ratatat) – Definitive Jux Presents IV (2009)
 Kid Cudi – "Pursuit of Happiness" (featuring MGMT & Ratatat) and "Alive (Nightmare)" from Man on the Moon: The End of Day (2009)
 Jay-Z – "$100 Bill" from The Great Gatsby: Music from Baz Luhrmann's Film (2013)
 Despot – "House of Bricks" – We’re All Excited (2015)
 E*vax – "The Mule" from Silicon Valley (Music from the HBO Original Series) (2017)
 Kids See Ghosts – "Feel the Love" (featuring Pusha T), "Fire" and "Reborn" from Kids See Ghosts (2018)
 Nas – "Adam and Eve" (featuring The-Dream) from Nasir (2018)
 Teyana Taylor – "Rose in Harlem" from K.T.S.E. (2018)
 Kanye West – "Selah" from Jesus Is King (2019)
 Teyana Taylor – "We Got Love" from The Album (2020)
 Kid Cudi – "Elsie's Baby Boy (Flashback)" and "The Pale Moonlight" from Man on the Moon III: The Chosen (2020)
 Kanye West – "God Breathed", "Moon", "Jail", "Jail pt. 2" , "Lord I Need You" and "Never Abandon Your Family" from Donda (2021)
 Kid Cudi – "Willing to Trust" (featuring Ty Dolla $ign) and "Livin' My Truth" from Entergalactic (2022)

References

External links
E*vax at Discogs
E*vax on Myspace
wweek.com – Interview with Evan and brother Eric Mast (September 13th, 2006)
sfstation.com – Interview with Evan Mast (Mar 23, 2007)
westword.com – Interview with Evan Mast (Aug 27, 2008)

American electronic musicians
Living people
Year of birth missing (living people)
Skidmore College alumni
Musicians from Cleveland
American record producers
American hip hop record producers
Record producers from Ohio